Richard K. Sanford (July 25, 1822 in Volney, Oswego County, New York – April 24, 1895 in Brooklyn, Kings County, New York) was an American newspaper editor and politician from New York.

Life
He was the son of Kingsbury E. Sanford. He graduated from Hamilton College in 1843. Then he taught school, and was in charge of Middlebury Academy and other schools, until 1855. In 1848, he married Lucy A. Carrier (d. 1859), and they had two children.

In 1856, he became the owner and editor of the Fulton Patriot and Gazette.

He was a member of the New York State Assembly (Oswego Co., 2nd D.) in 1861; of the New York State Senate (21st D.) in 1862 and 1863; and again of the State Assembly in 1865.

He was for 25 years a clerk in the Auditor's office of the New York Customs House, and died of "apoplexy" at his home at 394 State Street, in Brooklyn.

Sources
 The New York Civil List compiled by Franklin Benjamin Hough, Stephen C. Hutchins and Edgar Albert Werner (1870; pg. 443, 494 and 503)
 Biographical Sketches of the State Officers and the Members of the Legislature of the State of New York in 1862 and '63 by William D. Murphy (1863; pg. 105ff)
 THE OBITUARY RECORD; Richard K. Sanford in NYT on April 25, 1895

1822 births
1895 deaths
Republican Party New York (state) state senators
Republican Party members of the New York State Assembly
People from Oswego County, New York
Hamilton College (New York) alumni
19th-century American newspaper editors
People from Fulton, Oswego County, New York
American male journalists
19th-century American male writers
19th-century American politicians
Journalists from New York (state)